The Chapel of St John the Evangelist (St John's Chapel) is an 11th century chapel  located in the Tower of London. Built in 1080, St John’s is the oldest surviving complete chapel from the early Norman period, and functions today as a chapel royal.

History
St John’s Chapel was built as part of the original layout of the White Tower, which was constructed in 1077–97 as a keep or citadel, being the oldest part of William the Conqueror's powerful fortress. Constructed from Caen stone imported from France, St John’s has a tunnel-vaulted nave with groin-vaulted aisles and an east apse, above and around which curve the gallery.  Thick, round piers support unmoulded arches, notable for their simplicity, with simple carvings of scallop and leaf designs providing the only ornament. The programme of decoration was expanded by King Henry III, under whose orders three stained glass windows were installed in 1240. 

St John’s is unique in that other extant Norman churches in England date from the mid-12th century; its construction was begun in 1080.
Services are held in the chapel periodically during the year.

References

External links
 https://www.thechapelsroyalhmtoweroflondon.org.uk/welcome/the-chapel-of-st-john-the-evangelist/

Church of England church buildings in the London Borough of Tower Hamlets
Chapels in London
Grade I listed churches in London
London, Saint John's Chapel
London, Saint John's Chapel
London
11th-century church buildings in England